Scholarshare is the California State 529 plan, a tax-advantaged investment vehicle designed to encourage saving for the future higher education expenses of a designated beneficiary.

Notes

External links
Official site Retrieved 11 January 2019
Scholarshare at Lajollamom.com Retrieved 11 January 2019

Education finance in the United States
Education in California